A system file in computers is a critical computer file without which a computer system may not operate correctly. These files may come as part of the operating system, a third-party device driver or other sources. Microsoft Windows and MS-DOS mark their more valuable system files with a "system" attribute to protect them against accidental deletion. (Although the system attribute can be manually put on any arbitrary file; these files do not become system files.)

Specific example of system files include the files with .sys filename extension in MS-DOS. In Windows NT family, the system files are mainly under the folder C:\Windows\System32. In Mac OS they are in the System suitcase. And in Linux system the system files are located under folders /boot (the kernel itself), /usr/sbin (system utilities) and /usr/lib/modules (kernel device drivers).

Computer files